Tomislav Bašić (born May 4, 1980) is a former Bosnian-Herzegovinian football goalkeeper.

References

External links
Profile on Persianleague.com

1980 births
Living people
People from Široki Brijeg
Croats of Bosnia and Herzegovina
Association football goalkeepers
Bosnia and Herzegovina footballers
HŠK Posušje players
NK Široki Brijeg players
NK Međimurje players
Arka Gdynia players
Zawisza Bydgoszcz players
Hamyari Arak players
NK Imotski players
Premier League of Bosnia and Herzegovina players
Croatian Football League players
Ekstraklasa players
Azadegan League players
First Football League (Croatia) players
Bosnia and Herzegovina expatriate footballers
Expatriate footballers in Croatia
Bosnia and Herzegovina expatriate sportspeople in Croatia
Expatriate footballers in Poland
Bosnia and Herzegovina expatriate sportspeople in Poland
Expatriate footballers in Iran
Bosnia and Herzegovina expatriate sportspeople in Iran